John Nevett Steele (February 22, 1796 – August 13, 1853) was an American politician.

Early life
Steele was born on February 22, 1796, in Weston, Maryland.  He was the son of James Steele (1760–1816) and Mary Nevett (1769–1836).  His many siblings included Mary Nevett Steele, who married John Campbell Henry, the eldest son and heir of Gov. John Henry, Ann Billings Steele Upshur, James Billings Steele, Henry Maynadier Steele, Catharine Sarah Maria Steele Ray, Sarah Maynadier Steele, and Isaac Nevett Steele.

He lived on an estate called "Indian Town" near Vienna, Maryland, in Dorchester County, where he completed preparatory studies.  He later studied law, was admitted to the bar in 1819, and commenced practice in Dorchester County, Maryland.

Career
He served as a member of the Maryland House of Delegates from 1822 to 1824, in 1829, and again in 1830.  He continued to operate the family plantation, Indian Town.

Steele was elected as an Anti-Jacksonian to the Twenty-third Congress to fill the vacancy caused by the death of Littleton Purnell Dennis, and was reelected to the Twenty-fourth Congress, serving from May 29, 1834, to March 3, 1837.  He was an unsuccessful Whig candidate for Governor of Maryland in 1838.

Personal life
Steele was married to Ann Ogle Buchanan (1799–1839), the daughter of Thomas Buchanan (1768–1847) and Rebecca Maria Harriett Anderson (1770–1840). Together, they were the parents of:

 Dr. Thomas Buchanan Steele (1822–1905), who married Isabella Elizabeth Henry (1825–1912), granddaughter of Gov. John Henry.
 John Nevett Steele, Jr. (1824–1884), who married Ann Ogle Buchanan Henry (1842–1912), another granddaughter of Gov. John Henry.

Steele worked in agriculture until his death in Cambridge, Maryland, and is interred in Christ Protestant Episcopal Church Cemetery.

Descendants
Through his eldest son Thomas, he was the grandfather of Ogle Steele (1855–1918), Campbell Steele (1857–1884), and Mary Isabella Steele (1858–1944), who married Louis William Trail (1843–1923).

References
Notes

Sources

1796 births
1853 deaths
Members of the Maryland House of Delegates
People from Dorchester County, Maryland
Maryland Whigs
19th-century American politicians
National Republican Party members of the United States House of Representatives from Maryland